The Kashmir-Raj Bodhi Mahasabha (KRMBS) was an organisation founded by Kashmiri neo-Buddhists (Navayana) in 1931. Co-founded by activist Shridhar Kaul, KRMBS was active in "modernization and reform" efforts, such as campaigning against polyandrous marriage practices, as well as representing the interests of the Buddhist community in Ladakh as well as Kashmiri Buddhists in general, although its founding members were not Ladakhi.

References

Buddhist organisations based in India
Organisations based in Jammu and Kashmir
1931 establishments in India
Religious organizations established in 1931